Meet The Hockers is the Australian reality television series which premiered on 16 May 2017 until 4 July 2017 on 9Go!. It is produced and narrated by Kyle Sandilands and is similar in theme to Pawn Stars Australia.

This observational series looks inside ACEBEN, Australia's oldest and largest pawnshop's, established in 1907 (now franchised in 8 locations) in Haymarket, New South Wales. The shop is run by Michael Chambers and his team Pauly, Jess, Jaz and Aaron, who every day encounter new customers trying to negotiate the best deal.

See also

 Pawn Stars Australia
 List of Australian television series
 List of programs broadcast by Nine Network

References

External links 
   Meet The Hockers official website

9Go! original programming
2010s Australian reality television series
2017 Australian television series debuts
2017 Australian television series endings
English-language television shows
Antiques television series
Pawn shops
Television shows set in Sydney
Television series by Freehand Productions